"In the Mood" is a song by English recording artist Robert Plant from his second solo studio album, The Principle of Moments (1983). "In the Mood" was written by Plant, guitarist Robbie Blunt and bassist Paul Martinez.
The drummer on the recording was Genesis' Phil Collins.

As a popular album track it reached No. 4 on the Billboard Top Tracks chart. It was later released as a single and entered the Billboard Hot 100 on November 19, 1983, peaking at No. 39 in January 1984. It was Plant's second Top 40 single as a solo artist, following "Big Log", also from The Principle of Moments. In the UK the single peaked at No. 81 on the singles chart.

Chart performance

References

External links
 

1983 singles
Robert Plant songs
Songs written by Robert Plant
Songs written by Robbie Blunt
1983 songs